The men's 200 metre butterfly event at the 2016 Summer Olympics took place on 8–9 August at the Olympic Aquatics Stadium.

Summary
As the most decorated Olympian of all-time, Michael Phelps got the opportunity to avenge the distance butterfly title that he lost in London four years earlier, when South Africa's Chad le Clos beat him to the wall. Moving to the front at the halfway turn, Phelps held off the Japanese challenger Masato Sakai by a 0.04-second margin to claim his twentieth Olympic gold medal and twenty-fifth overall in 1:53.36. Coming from sixth at the 150-metre turn, Sakai made a late surge on the final length to nearly upset Phelps towards a close finish, but he ended up taking the silver in 1:53.40. Meanwhile, Hungary's top seed and 2014 Youth Olympic champion Tamás Kenderesi powered home with a bronze in 1:53.62.

Le Clos did not produce another striking effort to halt the most decorated Olympian from snatching the title, as he was shut out of the medals to fourth in 1:54.06. Sakai's teammate Daiya Seto finished fifth in 1:54.82, with Denmark's Viktor Bromer following him to pick up the sixth spot in 1:55.64. Hungarian swimmer, 2008 Olympic silver medalist, and reigning world champion László Cseh commanded a brief lead on the initial length, but faded shortly to seventh place in 1:56.24. Belgium's Louis Croenen rounded out the field with an eighth-place time in 1:57.04.

Records
Prior to this competition, the existing world and Olympic records were as follows.

Competition format

The competition consisted of three rounds: heats, semifinals, and a final. The swimmers with the best 16 times in the heats advanced to the semifinals. The swimmers with the best 8 times in the semifinals advanced to the final. Swim-offs were used as necessary to break ties for advancement to the next round.

Results

Heats

Semifinals

Semifinal 1

Semifinal 2

Final

References

Men's 00200 metre butterfly
Olympics
Men's events at the 2016 Summer Olympics